Keiadjara, also rendered Kiyajarra, were an Aboriginal Australian people of the Pilbara region of Western Australia.

Name
The name was also current among the Pitjantjatjara, but as one of their names for the Wenamba.

Country
The extent of their area is unknown, but they were located southeast of the Mandjildjara territory and south and east of the Putidjara. It ran, apparently, eastwards from an otherwise unknown site called Kolajuru, a week's trek from Tjundutjundu on the Canning Stock Route According to Ronald Berndt, the Keiadjara lived between Kumpupintil Lake and Lake Carnegie.

Alternative names
 Keiatara.
 Keredjara
 Kiadjara.
 Giadjara.
 Gijadjara.
 Targudi, Tjargudi.
 Djargudi, Targoodi.
 Kalgoneidjara.
 Kalguni.

Notes

Citations

Sources

Aboriginal peoples of Western Australia
Canning Stock Route
Mid West (Western Australia)